Vjetrenica  is the largest cave in Bosnia and Herzegovina, and the most biodiverse cave in the world. It is part of the Dinaric Alps mountain range, which is known for its karstic and speleological features. The cave is located in the Popovo field in Ravno, East Herzegovina in the Federation of Bosnia and Herzegovina.

Geography

Popovo Polje and cave location

Vjetrenica is located in Popovo Polje (pronounced , meaning priest's field, where polje stands for karstic plain), which is itself located in a southernmost regions of Bosnia and Herzegovina, West Herzegovina, near the Adriatic coast. 
Its entrance is near the village of Zavala, in west - south-western corner of polje. In the warmer parts of the year a strong blast of cold air blows from its entrance, which is very attractive in the middle of the rocky, hot and waterless terrain.

Popovo Polje is one of the largest polje (karstic plain) in Bosnia and Herzegovina and the world, famous for its karstic phenomenons and features, and particularly for its Trebišnjica River, which flows through the polje as largest sinking river (also losing stream, or influent stream) the world, as well as the Vjetrenica cave system, located to the west/south-western parts of the valley. 

The cave has been explored and described to a total of 7,014 m in length; of this the main channel is about 2.47 km long. It runs from the edge of Popovo Polje to the south, and on the basis of analysis of the terrain, geologists have predicted that Vjetrenica could stretch right to the Adriatic Sea in the Republic of Croatia, 15–20 km away from its entrance. Along with the hydrological arguments, this assumption is also supported by the "unnatural" end of Vjetrenica in the form of a huge heap of stone blocks that have caved in.

Vjetrenica is the richest cave in the world in terms of subterranean biodiversity: among more than two hundred different species are registered in it, almost hundred are troglophiles, a great number of them are narrow endemic, 15 are stenoendemic, and about 37 were discovered and described in Vjetrenica for the first time.

Natural and architectural assemble

Zavala Village
Located in Popovo Polje in Ravno municipality, village Zavala with its old architecture and stone masonry, together with Vjetrenica cave, constitute the natural and architectural ensemble, which is in the process of being protected as National Monument of Bosnia and Herzegovina, and as such it is already placed on UNESCO Tentative List.

Vjetrenica cave is considered to have richest cave fauna, with highest rate of endemism.  
Vjetrenica cave also acquired fame throughout the world geological and biological scientific communities, as well as environmental communities around the country and the world for its imperiled and uncertain future, caused by unprofessional management lacking any expertise, and uncertain status at state and especially local level.

UNESCO nomination
Despite all setbacks government of Bosnia and Herzegovina, although creepingly slowly, nominated Vjeternica (with village Zavala) to UNESCO Tentative List clearly expressing intention to protect the cave and its biodiversity and eventually inscribe it with UNESCO.

See also
List of caves in Bosnia and Herzegovina
 Livanjsko field
 Trebišnjica
 Saint Basil of Ostrog

References

External links
 Vjetrenica, official homepage
 Pećina Vjetrenica on showcaves.com

Geology of Bosnia and Herzegovina
Caves of Bosnia and Herzegovina
Karst caves of Bosnia and Herzegovina
Blowholes
Show caves
Tourist attractions in Bosnia and Herzegovina
World Heritage Tentative List for Bosnia and Herzegovina
Protected areas of Bosnia and Herzegovina
National Monuments of Bosnia and Herzegovina
Popovo Polje